Parker is a fictional character created by American novelist Donald E. Westlake. A professional robber specializing in large-scale, high-profit crimes, Parker is the main protagonist of 24 of the 28 novels Westlake wrote under the pseudonym Richard Stark.

Writing style
Westlake wrote under many pseudonyms as well as his own name, but the Richard Stark pseudonym was notable both for the sheer amount of writing credited to it (far more than any other except Westlake's real name itself), as well as for Stark's particular style of writing, which was colder, darker, less sentimental, and less overtly humorous than Westlake's usual prose. For a period in the late 1960s, the Stark name was more well-known and more lucrative for Westlake than his real name. According to Westlake, he chose the name "Richard Stark" for actor Richard Widmark, whose performance in the film Kiss of Death impressed Westlake: "part of the character's fascination and danger is his unpredictability. He's fast and mean, and that's what I wanted the writing to be: crisp and lean, no fat, trimmed down ... stark." Westlake described the difference between Stark's style and his usual style in a 2001 article for the New York Times Book Review: "Stark and Westlake use language very differently. To some extent they're mirror images. Westlake is allusive, indirect, referential, a bit rococo. Stark strips his sentences down to the necessary information."

Overview
A ruthless career criminal, Parker has almost no traditional redeeming qualities, aside from efficiency and professionalism. Parker is callous, meticulous, and perfectly willing to commit murder if he deems it necessary.  He does, however, live by one ethical principle: he will not double-cross another professional criminal with whom he is working, unless they try to double-cross him. Should that happen, Parker will unhesitatingly undertake to exact a thorough and brutal revenge.

Parker's first name is never mentioned in the novels, and there are many details about him which remain unknown.  In fact, it is hinted throughout the series that the name "Parker" might itself be an alias.

In a 1981 introduction to a reprint of The Mourner (1963), Westlake's friend and fellow crime novelist Lawrence Block describes Parker as rare among anti-hero protagonists in that the character never develops a conscience. Block argues that novelists are generally "uncomfortable writing consistently from an antisocial perspective", and tend to soften such characters over time. However, "[Parker] never turns honest, or finds God, or starts working as a secret agent for the government."  According to Block a sign of Westlake's genius, and the key factor in the character's durability across the decades, was the realization that "[a] mellow Parker is no Parker at all." Albert Frederick Nussbaum, a bank robber turned writer, notes that given Parker's "cold, methodical [and] humorless" habits, the character would be the villain in most books. But Nussbaum also identifies two critical elements that make Parker a sympathetic protagonist: first, he is surrounded by criminals even more ruthless than he, and, second, though Parker is capable of using violence he rarely if ever initiates violence except in self-defense.

Character 
While in 1966's The Handle Parker's age is explicitly stated to be 38, Parker is, essentially, an ageless character—in the various Parker novels that were written and take place over a span of 45 years, Parker always appears to be somewhere around 40.

Physically, Parker is described in the opening paragraphs of The Hunter as "big and shaggy, with flat square shoulders... His hands, swinging curve-fingered at his sides, looked like they were molded of brown clay by a sculptor who thought big and liked veins. His hair was brown and dry and dead, blowing around his head like a poor toupee about to fly loose. His face was a chipped chunk of concrete, with eyes of flawed onyx. His mouth was a quick stroke, bloodless." When asked about who he would cast as Parker, Westlake stated: "Usually I don’t put an actor’s face to the character, though with Parker, in the early days, I did think he probably looked something like Jack Palance. That may be partly because you knew Palance wasn’t faking it, and Parker wasn’t faking it either. Never once have I caught him winking at the reader." In The Man With the Getaway Face, Parker has plastic surgery in an attempt to evade The Outfit's retribution, so he's no longer recognizable to most who knew him before, though his general appearance (and the impression it makes on others) seems to be largely unchanged.

In terms of his interactions with others, Parker dislikes small talk, and has little use for social pleasantries.  Instead, he prefers to converse as little as possible, and will end conversations abruptly once he feels that he has obtained the information he requires.  Parker has few interests outside his work, and when he is planning or executing a heist, he is focused on it to the exclusion of almost everything else.  However, once the heist is complete, Parker has an almost overwhelming desire to have sex.  Though he has a wide range of professional contacts, Parker has no friends.

His first name is never revealed in the series, a decision Westlake has stated he made when thinking that The Hunter would be a standalone book and which he stuck to even though it complicated writing the subsequent books. Westlake himself never definitively settled on a first name for the character, once musing "I don't know what the hell it would be, maybe Frank."

No mention is ever made of Parker's family. While the events of previous novels are frequently referred to throughout the series, very little that happened in Parker's life before his appearance in The Hunter is ever discussed. In The Outfit, it is stated that he had been in the Army from 1942 to 1944 and had been given a bad conduct discharge for blackmarketeering.

The closest Westlake has ever come to alluding to Parker's childhood is in the novel Butcher's Moon, when Parker surveys the fictional city of Tyler and thinks to himself that it is a very different place from where he grew up. As well, in The Sour Lemon Score, it's mentioned that Parker was "born and raised in cities", but no further details are offered.  In The Outfit Parker does state he had already been a thief for 18 years, and refers to a heist he committed in 1949. In Chapter 3 of The Man With the Getaway Face it is mentioned that Parker "owned a couple parking lots and gas stations around the country". He has virtually no involvement with the operation of these businesses, allowing the managers to skim profits in exchange for creating the appearance of Parker having a legitimate source of income to avoid suspicion from "internal revenue beagles".

In the essay The Gentrification of Crime, which appeared in the March 28, 1985 issue of The New York Review of Books, Lucy Sante (then known as Luc Sante) offered the following analysis of the character:

In Parker's world there is no good or evil, but simply different styles of crime. There is no law, so Parker cannot be caught, but merely injured or delayed. The subversive implication is not that crime pays, but that all business is crime. Among the Homeric epithets that follow Parker from book to book is: 'He had to be a businessman of some kind. The way he looked, big and square and hard, it had to be a tough and competitive business; used cars maybe, or jukeboxes.' He is a loner, competing with conglomerates (the syndicate) and fending off marginal elements (psychotics, amateurs). He has no interest in society except as a given, like the weather, and none in power. He is a freebooter who acquires money in order to buy himself periods of vegetative quiet.

Contrary to what Sante says, Parker was arrested and imprisoned twice in the series—first in The Hunter for vagrancy, then much later, in Breakout after a heist goes wrong. In both cases, his real identity wasn't known to the authorities at the time of arrest, and he escaped both times from facilities with relatively low security.  However, Parker's always very aware that the law is out there, and that his fingerprints are linked to the murder of a guard at a prison camp—which means that he has no chance of ever being released if caught and properly identified. In the original version of The Hunter submitted to publishers, Parker was stopped by the police at the end, and killed trying to escape.  Bucklin Moon, an editor for Pocket Books, said he'd buy the novel, on condition that Parker got away, so that he could appear in a series of books, instead of just one.

In a similar tone, author Ian Sansom, in The Guardian (March 3, 2007), wrote of Parker as

...always restless, always on the move; forever hunted, forever hunting, crisscrossing the country following the mighty dollar, trying to make his way in the only way he knows how: through scheming, cheating, and the exercise of brute force. But Parker is by no means merely evil, merciless or insane; the brilliance of the books lies in their blurring of the distinction between madness and sanity, justice and mercy. Parker is not so much sick as blank, with the deep blankness of... humanity stripped to its essentials... [he is] callous, unable to feel guilt for his actions, completely lacking in empathy and incapable of learning from his own bitter experience... we admire and yearn for Parker's demented sense of purpose: he feels no embarrassment or shame... he is never afflicted or careworn; he is, in the way of all existential heroes and madmen, somehow stenchless, blameless and utterly free.

Other recurring characters
 Claire Carroll: Parker gained a steady companion in Claire Carroll in 1968's The Rare Coin Score.  Claire is perfectly aware of what Parker does for a living, and has no qualms about it. The usually roving and unfaithful Parker stayed with Claire so long because she was the first steady girlfriend Parker had as an adult who didn't pry into his affairs or disapprove of his career. She is rarely involved in his work, and never as an active participant after her first appearance.  Consequently, although Claire is a consistent presence in the later books, she is often an 'offstage' character, though Parker occasionally relies on her for a variety of functions that she, having no criminal record, can accomplish more easily.
 Joe Sheer and Handy McKay:  People who want to contact Parker in a professional capacity cannot do so directly, but must arrange a meeting through a third party contact.  For the first few books in the series, Parker's contact is retired felon Joe Sheer, who lives in Nebraska.  After the events of The Jugger, Parker's contact becomes Handy McKay.  McKay is seen in a few early books as a compatriot of Parker. Having made enough money to retire on (and worried that he might be losing a step or two), Handy quits being an active criminal, and buys a diner in Presque Isle, Maine.  Working in Maine, he still acts as the contact for Parker and several other criminals.
 Alan Grofield:  Parker sometimes associates with an actor named Alan Grofield, who moonlights as a criminal to finance his theatrical ventures. The wisecracking Grofield first appeared in The Score (1964), and made his last appearance in Butcher's Moon (1974).  A ladies' man with a theatrical flair, Grofield also stars in four Stark-penned novels of his own: The Damsel (1967), The Dame (1969), The Blackbird (1969) and  Lemons Never Lie (1971). Unlike Parker, Grofield can be friendly, chatty and gregarious in all types of company—but, like Parker, Grofield does not hesitate to use brutal violence (when necessary) in pursuit of his goals.  Unlike Parker, who seems to be monogamous with Claire after the events of The Rare Coin Score, Grofield routinely and guiltlessly cheats on his wife and fellow thespian Mary (whom he met while helping Parker rob her entire town in The Score) nearly every time he's away from her on a heist—even though their relationship is close and passionate. Grofield practices situational morality, and it's up to the reader to decide whether that's better or worse than no morality at all.

The Stark novels The Blackbird (1969) and Slayground (1971) have near-identical first chapters, detailing a failed robbery involving Grofield and Parker.  The Blackbird then  follows Grofield's escape from the robbery scene, while Slayground follows Parker's reaction to events.

 Ed and Brenda Mackey:  A dependable husband-and-wife team Parker works with on several occasions.
 Salsa: A former Latin American revolutionary, turned gigolo, turned armed robber.
 Stan Devers: First appearing as the easy going inside man for the robbery of an Air Force payroll, Devers is treated as a protege of sorts by Parker throughout the job. After being exposed and forced to go on the run he assists Parker in two further scores.
 Dan Wycza: A fitness-obsessed strong-arm man for multiple Parker jobs and part-time wrestler.
 Nick Dalesia: A driver who first appears in Butcher's Moon (1974). He plays a bigger role in an ongoing arc throughout the final three books, getting Parker involved in a job which also leads to Dalesia becoming viewed as too dangerous to be around after killing a cop while escaping from custody.
  Frank Elkins and Ralph Wiss: Associates of Parker who first appear at the end of the first book, and have a decades-long partnership.
 Mike Carlow: A getaway driver who spends his loot on financing his second career as a stock-car racer.
 Philly Webb: Another driver, whose primary hobby is constantly renovating his car in order to make it untraceable.
 Bronson: The head of "The Outfit," a nationwide organized-crime ring. In the first book, Parker becomes a threat to Bronson's operations, causing Bronson's hitmen to pursue him for the next two novels, before Parker seeks revenge.
 Karns: A high-ranking member of the Outfit who takes over after Bronson's death. He cancels the bounty on Parker and in later stories sometimes recommends him to associates or tries to recruit him for jobs.
 Fairfax: A subordinate of Bronson who is twice held at gunpoint and used as a messenger by Parker, once to contact Bronson, and once Karns.
 Detective Wendy "Gwen" Reversa: A state police detective who pursues Parker in Nobody Runs Forever (2004) and Dirty Money (2008).
 Captain Robert Modale: A state police official who purses Parker in the final two books, briefly working with Gwen Reversa in Dirty Money (2008).
 Briggs: An explosive man who works with Parker in Butcher's Moon (1974). Although semi-retired following the events of that novel, he later provides Parker with weapons to use for the heist in Nobody Runs Forever (2004).
 Adolf Lozini: Head of organized crime in the fictional city of Tyler. His men attempt to kill Parker to rob him of his heist money in Slayground (1969), with Lozini becoming invested in this after Parker kills his chosen successor. When Parker returns for his cached money in Butcher's Moon (1974), he initially goes to war with Lozini again to recover it, but stumbles into the middle of a coup by several of Lozini's inner circle, who are responsible for finding and taking Parker's money.
 Fred Ducasse: An experienced and even-tempered but sometimes unlucky man who works three jobs with Parker, two of which fall apart in the planning stage.
 Lou Sternberg: A Parker associate who lives in England and makes it a policy to never work there, traveling to America to commit a crime whenever he runs low on money.
 George Uhl: A double-crossing associate of Parker who survives their first run-in to return in a later novel, seeking to kill him.
 Noelle Braselle: A former hippie and niece of another career criminal who works on two of Parker's jobs.
 Paul Brock and Matt Rosenstein: A mismatched gay couple involved in a variety of crimes, they first clash with Parker over George Uhl's money, with Parker leaving them for dead. They return in a later book, with Rosentstein having been paralyzed form his injuries, and the two seeking revenge against Parker.
 Madge: Owner of a boarding house Parker and his associates sometimes stay at between jobs, or hide loot at.
 Tom Hurley: An easily irritable colleague of Parker from Butcher's Moon (1974). After being injured during a shootout, he acts as a broker between other professionals looking to build crews, in Flashfire (1998).
 George Walhiem: A bespectacled small-time lock man who becomes involved in two jobs with Parker, both of which end poorly due to other members of the crew.
 Frank Meany: An organized-crime figure introduced in Firebreak (2001) who tries to kill Parker on behalf of Brock and Rosenstein. In Dirty Money (2008) Parker is forced to deal with him in order to dispose of some marked money from a job.
 Nelson McWhitney: A bar owner who is involved in the heist in the second-to-last book Nobody Runs Forever (2004), the aftermath of which pours into the subsequent two books.
 Sandra Loscalzo: A somewhat mercenary lesbian private investigator who lives with her girlfriend and her daughter. She is introduced in Nobody Runs Forever (2004) pursuing the bounty on a man who has been murdered by Parker, and ends up abetting his operation in exchange for the location of the body, despite McWhitney's murder of a fellow investigator. She reappears in Dirty Money (2008), helping Parker and McWhitney smuggle their cached robbery money out of town in exchange for a cut.
 Dr. Myron Madchen: an accomplice to the job in Nobody Runs Forever (2004), hoping to use the money to get out of an unhappy marriage. He reappears in the final book reluctantly providing shelter to Dalesia while he's on the run.
 Bett Harrow: a femme fatale and one-night stand of Parker's in the third book, The Outfit. After being entrusted with a murder weapon he'd used she ends up using it to blackmail him into stealing a statute for her art-collector father in the next story, The Mourner.
 Paul Dunstan: and O'Hara: Corrupt policemen who join the gangsters chasing parker in Slayground (1969). By the time of Butcher's Moon (1974) Dunstan has taken up an honest job in another city while O'Hara remains on the force and is becoming seen as a liability.
 Donald Snyder: A night watchman in Tyler who has the misfortune to be accosted and tied up twice as a result of Parker's jobs, in Slayground (1969) and Butcher's Moon (1974).
 Mike Abadandi: A soldier for Lozini's crime syndicate who is among those chasing Parker in Slayground (1969) and also makes an attempt on his life in Butcher's Moon (1974).
 Pete Rudd: A former carpenter and member of Parker's crew in The Seventh (1966), where he is viciously beaten by a fellow criminal and then arrested by the police. Rudd has been released from prison by the time of Backflash (1998) where he plays an off-screen role in facilitating an introduction between Parker and another criminal.

Novel structure 
Westlake used the same structure for many of the Parker novels, a method that Library Review described as "clever."

Each book is divided into four sections of roughly equal length, each in turn subdivided into shorter chapters. The first and second sections are written in a limited third-person perspective focused entirely on Parker as he plans and undertakes a robbery or heist with colleagues. The second section ends on a cliffhanger, as Parker is betrayed—often injured and left for dead. Section three shifts to the perspective of Parker's opponents, usually in flashback as they plan and execute their double-cross. Section four returns to Parker's perspective as he survives the plot against him and sets out for revenge.

Appearances

Novels by Richard Stark
The first novel in Parker's series is The Hunter (adapted to film twice: as Point Blank in 1967, and as Payback in 1999), in which he chases a past associate who betrayed him in a heist and left him for dead. He survives, but is arrested by the police. Slowly and methodically, Parker tracks down Mal Resnick, his former accomplice, who intimidated Parker's weak-willed wife into shooting her husband after the job had been completed. When the gambling syndicate known as The Outfit refuses to return to Parker his share of the loot Resnick gave them to make good on a debt, Parker takes on The Outfit as well, a storyline that figures in several subsequent books in the series.

In subsequent novels, Parker is often at work, putting together a team of professionals to plan and execute daring heists. Parker's numerous memorable adventures include robbing an entire town in The Score, a football stadium in The Seventh, an island casino in The Handle, an Air Force base in The Green Eagle Score, and a rock concert in Deadly Edge. Always perfectly blueprinted heists, Parker's plans tend to go awry in the execution, sometimes due to bad luck but more often due to greed or incompetence on the part of Parker's less-experienced partners. The tension in the novels often comes from Parker having to work his way out of increasingly dangerous situations on the fly, as his carefully planned heist collapses around him—all while he tries to keep hold of both the money he stole, and his life. (And, often, he does so while endeavoring to exact revenge on those responsible for his troubles.)

Throughout the course of the series, Parker has operated under a number of pseudonyms, and it is implied that the name Parker itself is an alias. In the first novel in the series, Parker is arrested for vagrancy and is imprisoned in a work camp under the name Ronald Kasper, a name that is linked to his real fingerprints. In the next five novels in the series, The Man with the Getaway Face, The Outfit, The Mourner, The Score, and The Jugger, Parker lives comfortably in a Florida hotel under the name Charles Willis between jobs, but is forced to abandon this identity (and the money that goes with it) when police show up at his hotel at the end of The Jugger. In some later books, he uses Edward Latham as his "straight" name. It's mainly other heavy heisters and people who live outside the law who know him as Parker.

In the novel The Rare Coin Score, Parker meets Claire Carroll, the woman who will become his companion for the rest of the series. They live together somewhere in northern New Jersey in a lake house owned under the name Claire Willis (she took this surname from Parker's past). In the novel Backflash, their home is described as "a house on a lake called Colliver Pond, seventy miles from New York, a deep rural corner where New York and New Jersey and Pennsylvania meet... mostly a resort community, lower-level white-collar, people who came here three months every summer and left their 'cottages' unoccupied the rest of the year... For Parker, it was ideal. A place to stay, to lie low when nothing was going on, a 'home' as people called it, and no neighbors. In the summer, when the clerks came out to swim and fish and boat, Parker and Claire went somewhere else."

 The Hunter (Pocket Books, 1962; re-released in 1999 under the title Payback as a movie tie-in by Grand Central Publishing)
 The Man with the Getaway Face (Pocket Books, 1963) also published as The Steel Hit
 The Outfit (Pocket Books, 1963)
 The Mourner (Pocket Books, 1963)
 The Score (Pocket Books, 1964) also published as Killtown
 The Jugger (Pocket Books, 1965)
 The Seventh (Pocket Books, 1966) also published as The Split
 The Handle (Pocket Books, 1966) also published as Run Lethal
 The Rare Coin Score (Gold Medal, 1967)
 The Green Eagle Score (Gold Medal, 1967)
 The Black Ice Score (Gold Medal, 1968)
 The Sour Lemon Score (Gold Medal, 1969)
 Deadly Edge (Random House, 1971)
 Slayground (Random House, 1971 — first chapter shared with The Blackbird, a novel in Westlake's Alan Grofield series)
 Plunder Squad (Random House, 1972)
 Butcher's Moon (Random House, 1974)
 Comeback (Mysterious Press, 1997)
 Backflash (Mysterious Press, 1998)
 Flashfire (Mysterious Press, 2000)
 Firebreak (Mysterious Press, 2001)
 Breakout (Mysterious Press, 2002)
 Nobody Runs Forever (Mysterious Press, 2004)
 Ask the Parrot (Mysterious Press, 2006)
 Dirty Money (Grand Central, 2008)

Also appears in:

 The Blackbird (1969) by Richard Stark — Parker appears only in the first chapter of this novel starring Alan Grofield.
 Dead Skip (1972) by Joe Gores — Parker appears briefly in Chapter 18, in a sequence that was also described (from a different viewpoint) in Plunder Squad (1972). Gores hints further at the connection between the two books by referring to Parker's associates as "the plunder squad."  Additionally, earlier in the novel, the book's protagonist is described as being a reader only of Richard Stark novels.
 Jimmy the Kid (1974) by Donald E. Westlake — This novel in Westlake's John Dortmunder series features the gang planning a caper based on a Parker novel they have. Chapters alternate between Parker committing a kidnapping (in the otherwise unavailable novel Child Heist) and the Dortmunder gang screwing it up as they try to imitate Parker.  Only a few chapters of Child Heist are featured, and this particular Parker story is not complete on its own.

Influences

Literary spinoffs and crossovers 
The Westlake novel The Hot Rock (1970) was originally intended to feature Parker, but the plot, which involves a precious gem that is stolen, lost, stolen again, lost again, and so on seemed too comic a situation for the hard-boiled Parker, so Westlake rewrote the novel with a more bumbling and likable cast of characters, including John Dortmunder, who is Parker seen through a comic mirror. The third Dortmunder novel, Jimmy the Kid (1974), features a plot in which Dortmunder and his associates base a kidnapping on a plan from a (fictitious) Parker novel called Child Heist. Ironically, in the main Parker novels, Parker repeatedly expresses disgust for kidnappers. Good Behavior (1985) was originally intended as the seventeenth Parker novel following Butcher's Moon (1974), but, like The Hot Rock, was rewritten for Dortmunder.  Good Behavior bore the dedication "To P., 1962-1974"—the dates the original Parker novels were published.

The Parker novel Plunder Squad (1972) contains a brief encounter with a San Francisco detective named Kearney, who is not looking for Parker but for one of his associates. The same encounter is described from Kearney's point of view in the Joe Gores DKA novel Dead Skip (1972). Westlake and Gores repeated the same trick in 1990 with matching sequences in the DKA novel 32 Cadillacs and the Dortmunder novel Drowned Hopes.

The second Dortmunder novel, Bank Shot has Dortmunder's new accomplice Herman X claim to have been involved in a robbery with Stan Devers, Mort Kobler (who appears in The Outfit) and George Cathcart (who briefly appears in the final Grofield novel, Lemons Never Lie). Dortmunder is familiar with Kobler and his friend Kelp knows Catchcart.

Portrayals 
Parker has been portrayed numerous times in films. Westlake refused to allow productions to use the name unless a whole series of films were planned based on the novels. Substitute names were created—starting with Lee Marvin starring as Walker in Point Blank (based on The Hunter), Michel Constantin as Georges in Pillaged (based on The Score), Anna Karina as Paula Nelson in Made in U.S.A. (partly based on The Jugger), Jim Brown as McClain in The Split, Robert Duvall as Earl Macklin in The Outfit,  Peter Coyote as Stone in Slayground, and Mel Gibson as Porter in Payback (the second screen adaptation based on The Hunter).

After Westlake's death, his widow, Abby, sold the screen rights to the novel Flashfire to producer Les Alexander and allowed for the name Parker to be used in the adaptation, with the option of further novels being adapted should the first one prove successful. Jason Statham was cast as the titular character in Parker. A decade later, it was reported that Shane Black had written a script for a film he's attached to direct titled Play Dirty, which is said to be based on the Parker series overall without specifying the novel it was based on. The project is intended to launch a franchise with a shared universe consisting of films and television series for Amazon Studios with the possibility of featuring other Westlake characters. Robert Downey, Jr. is set to portray Parker.

Homages 

Author Dan Simmons has paid homage to Westlake and his Parker character with three hard-boiled action novels featuring the character of Joe Kurtz, a past and current private investigator who spent time in Attica prison.  The first novel, Hardcase, is dedicated to Richard Stark/Donald Westlake. In the third Kurtz novel, Hard as Nails, Kurtz mentions that he did not know his father, but that he was a career criminal thief who went by a single name and would have sex with women after a job, a clear reference to Parker.

Max Allan Collins authored a series of novels with a protagonist named "Nolan" who was an homage to Westlake's Parker. Collins said of the character: "[T]he concept was to take a Parker-like character who has reached the ancient age of 48 and wants badly to retire, and of course needs one last heist to do so."

The television series Leverage features a character named "Parker". As played by Beth Riesgraf, Parker is an expert thief, cat-burglar, pickpocket and safe-cracker. Like Stark's Parker, this character is also only known by the single name "Parker".

Jim Doherty's short story, "The Ghost of Dillinger," published in the anthology Tales from the Red Lion, pits his series cop, Dan Sullivan, against a legendary criminal named "Karper," whose backstory derives from Stark's Parker novels.  Doherty contacted Westlake ahead of time to get approval for this deliberate homage to his character.

The graphic novel featuring Catwoman, Selina's Big Score, by Darwyn Cooke features a character resembling Parker, an experienced professional thief known only by his last name, Starka reference to the pseudonym used by Westlake for the Parker novels.

In other media

Films
 Made in USA (1966) was based on the novel The Jugger and directed by Jean-Luc Godard. It starred Anna Karina as a journalist investigating the disappearance of her boyfriend. Characters were named after the writer David Goodis, director Don Siegel and actor Richard Widmark — people influential in the genre of film noir. The film's producer, Georges de Beauregard, did not complete payments for rights to the novel, so Westlake took him to court (after litigation Westlake was given North American distribution rights). The film had a theatrical release in the U.S. in 2009.
 Point Blank (1967, MGM) was based on the novel The Hunter. It was directed by John Boorman and starred Lee Marvin as Walker, the Parker character. The film also starred Angie Dickinson, John Vernon, Carroll O'Connor and Keenan Wynn.
 Pillaged (1967) was a French film based on the novel The Score and directed by Alain Cavalier. Michel Constantin played Georges, the Parker character, and Franco Interlenghi appeared as Maurice, the Grofield character. An English-dubbed version, titled Midnight Raid, was distributed by United Artists to some territories in 1969. The film did not have a theatrical release in the U.S. until 2013, when it was screened at the Museum of Modern Art (MOMA).  
 The Split (1968, MGM) was based on the novel The Seventh. It starred Jim Brown as McClain, the Parker character. It also starred Gene Hackman, Julie Harris, Diahann Carroll, Jack Klugman, Donald Sutherland, Warren Oates, James Whitmore and Ernest Borgnine.
 The Outfit (1973, MGM) was based on the novel of the same name. It was directed by John Flynn and starred Robert Duvall as Earl Macklin, the Parker character. It also starred Joe Don Baker, Karen Black and Robert Ryan.
 Slayground (1983) was based on the novel of the same name. It was directed by Terry Bedford and starred Peter Coyote as Stone.
 Payback (1999) was based on the novel The Hunter. Writer/director Brian Helgeland was removed from the project after test screenings and new footage was written by Terry Hayes and directed by Paul Abascal. The film starred Mel Gibson as Porter, the Parker character. It also featured Gregg Henry, Maria Bello, David Paymer, Deborah Kara Unger, Kris Kristofferson, Lucy Liu and an uncredited James Coburn. Helgeland's version was released as Payback – Straight Up: The Director's Cut for a small theatrical run in 2006 and on DVD in 2007. This version's plot more closely follows the novel.
 Parker, an adaptation of the novel Flashfire, was released in January 2013. Jason Statham stars as the title character, along with Jennifer Lopez, Nick Nolte, and Michael Chiklis.

Comics
Darwyn Cooke wrote and illustrated a graphic novel based on The Hunter published by IDW in July 2009. The story is a faithful adaptation of the novel, retaining its 1962 setting. Cooke produced the work in consultation with Westlake (who died before he could see the final product). Westlake was reportedly impressed enough that he gave his blessing for Cooke to use the name Parker for the central character—something he had not allowed with any film adaptation of the Parker novels. Cooke went on to adapt The Outfit, released in October 2010. The third adaptation, The Score, was released in July 2012, and the fourth—Slayground—was released in January 2014. Slayground also contained an adaptation of The Seventh in abbreviated form as an added bonus. The contract to adapt the series had been extended past the intended four books, as Cooke wanted very much to adapt Butcher's Moon, and possibly others, but Cooke's death in 2016 left these plans unfinished.

References

External links
 Article about the Parker novels
 Interview with Donald Westlake, author of the Parker novels
 The Violent World of Parker tribute site
 The Westlake Review, reviewing all Westlake (and Stark) novels, in progress

Characters in pulp fiction
Fictional con artists
Fictional professional thieves
Fictional murderers
Fictional outlaws
Fictional prison escapees
Characters in American novels of the 20th century
Characters in American novels of the 21st century
Literary characters introduced in 1962
Male literary villains
Thriller film characters